Frederick Elmes,  (born November 4, 1946) is an American cinematographer, known for his association with the independent film movement. He is a long-time collaborator of directors David Lynch, Ang Lee, Charlie Kaufman, Jim Jarmusch, and Todd Solondz. He has won the Independent Spirit Award for Best Cinematography twice, for Wild at Heart and Night on Earth, and a Primetime Emmy Award for Outstanding Cinematography for a Limited Series for The Night Of.

Life and career
Born in Mountain Lakes, New Jersey, Elmes studied photography at the Rochester Institute of Technology, then attended the American Film Institute in Los Angeles, graduating in 1972. He enrolled in the Graduate Film Program at New York University's Department of Film and Television and graduated in 1975.

At the American Film Institute, Elmes met aspiring film director David Lynch, who hired him for Eraserhead. Since then the two have collaborated on Blue Velvet and Wild at Heart. Elmes is also a frequent collaborator with directors Ang Lee and Jim Jarmusch. He has been a member of the American Society of Cinematographers since 1993.

Filmography

Feature films

Additional photography credits

Short films

Documentaries

Television

References

External links
 
 www.FredElmes.com
 Eraserhead Interview

1946 births
American cinematographers
AFI Conservatory alumni
Independent Spirit Award winners
Living people
People from Mountain Lakes, New Jersey
Rochester Institute of Technology alumni